Dromaeosaurus ("running lizard") is a genus of dromaeosaurid theropod dinosaur that lived from the middle late Campanian to the mid Maastrichtian ages of the Late Cretaceous (sometime between 80 to 69 million years ago) in what is now the province of Alberta in Western Canada, as well as the Northwestern United States. The type species is Dromaeosaurus albertensis, first described by William Diller Matthew and Barnum Brown in 1922, with the latter having first discovered its fossils in the Dinosaur Park Formation in 1914. Teeth attributed to this genus have also been found in the Prince Creek Formation of Alaska. Dromaeosaurus is the type genus of both Dromaeosauridae and Dromaeosaurinae, which include many genera with very similar characteristics to Dromaeosaurus, one of which being its possible sister taxon Dakotaraptor. Dromaeosaurus was somewhat heavily built, more so than other dromaeosaurs that are similar in size, such as Velociraptor.

Discovery and naming

Despite receiving widespread attention through popular books, TV shows, documentaries, etc. on dinosaurs, along with the usage of a complete mounted skeletal cast in museums throughout the world, Dromaeosaurus is somewhat poorly known from actual fossils. The preparation of the popular cast by the Tyrrell Museum in Alberta was only made possible through the knowledge gained from other dromaeosaurids that were discovered more recently.

The first known Dromaeosaurus remains were discovered by paleontologist Barnum Brown during a 1914 expedition to the Red Deer River in Alberta on behalf of the American Museum of Natural History. The area where the bones were collected is now a part of Dinosaur Provincial Park in Alberta. Several other skull fragments, along with around thirty isolated teeth, are known from subsequent discoveries in Alberta and Montana.

In 1922, William Diller Matthew and Brown named and described the type species of Dromaeosaurus as Dromaeosaurus albertensis. The specific name, "albertensis", refers to it first being found in Alberta.

Another seven species of Dromaeosaurus were named: Dromaeosaurus laevifrons (Cope 1876) Matthew & Brown 1922; Dromaeosaurus cristatus (Cope 1876) Matthew & Brown 1922 (Troodon); Dromaeosaurus? gracilis (Marsh 1888) Matthew & Brown 1922; Dromaeosaurus explanatus (Cope 1876) Kuhn 1939; Dromaeosaurus minutus (Marsh 1892) Russell 1972 (an alvarezsaurid); Dromaeosaurus falculus (Cope 1876) Olshevsky 1979 and Dromaeosaurus mongoliensis (Barsbold 1983) Paul 1988 (Adasaurus). Most of them were based on fragmentary material, some belonging to other genera, and were much less complete than that of Dromaeosaurus albertensis. Those that haven't been reclassified are considered to be nomina dubia today. Nevertheless, it has grown apparent that Dromaeosaurus albertensis is even rarer in its habitat than other small theropods, despite it being the first dromaeosaurid of which reasonably good cranial material was described.The caenagnathid oviraptorosaurian Chirostenotes was once considered to be synonymous with Dromaeosaurus at one point in time.

Description

Its mouth was full of sharp teeth and it probably had a large, sharply curved "sickle claw" on the second toe of each foot. It lived during the mid Campanian to the mid Maastrichtian ages of the Late Cretaceous. However, some fragmentary remains that may belong to this genus, such as teeth, have been found from the late Maastrichthian age Hell Creek and Lance Formations of Montana and Wyoming, respectively, dating to roughly 66 million years ago. Teeth attributed to Dromaeosaurus have also been found in the Aguja Formation of Texas.

Dromaeosaurus had a relatively robust skull with a fairly deep snout. Its teeth were rather large for its size and shaped like a curved cone with a coat of enamel covering the crown. It had only nine teeth in each maxilla. Dromaeosaurus also had a vein at the back of its head, the vena capitis dorsalis, which drained the front neck muscles through two long canals running to the posterior surface of the brain. The Meckelian groove of Dromaeosaurus is rather shallow and does not have much depth to it.

Classification

Matthew and Brown originally placed Dromaeosaurus in its own subfamily, Dromaeosaurinae, within  "Deinodontidae" (which is now known as Tyrannosauridae), based on some similarities in the general proportions of its skull. In 1969, John Ostrom recognized that Dromaeosaurus shared many features with Velociraptor and the newly discovered Deinonychus, and so assigned them to a new family: Dromaeosauridae. Since then, many newer relatives of Dromaeosaurus have been found worldwide.

The exact relationships of Dromaeosaurus are somewhat unclear. Although its rugged build gives it a somewhat primitive appearance, it was actually a highly specialized animal. In an analysis of the clade Dromaeosaurinae, species such as Utahraptor, Achillobator, and Yurgovuchia have been recovered. The genus Dakotaraptor has been classified as the sister taxon to Dromaeosaurus, but some more recent analyses do not recover such a close relationship.

Below is a cladogram by Senter et al. from 2012. Dromaeosaurus is recovered as the sister taxon to Yurgovuchia, Utahraptor and Achillobator.

The cladogram below follows a 2015 analysis by paleontologists Robert DePalma, David Burnham, Larry Martin, Peter Larson, and Robert Bakker, using updated data from the Theropod Working Group. In this analysis, Dromaeosaurus is classified as the sister taxon of Dakotaraptor.

Paleobiology 
 
Dromaeosaurus differs from most of its relatives in having a short, massive skull, a deep mandible, and robust teeth. Its teeth tend to be more heavily worn down than those of its relative Saurornitholestes, suggesting that its jaws were used for crushing and tearing, rather than simply slicing through flesh. Therrien et al. (2005) estimated that Dromaeosaurus had a somewhat powerful bite force, nearly three times as powerful as that of Velociraptor, and suggested it relied more on its jaws than on the sickle claw of its second toe to kill its prey. In a study predominantly centered around Shuvuuia, Dromaeosaurus was compared to the former and also to Tyrannosaurus, in which both Dromaeosaurus and Tyrannosaurus were discovered to be diurnal predators.

Feeding behavior 
Dromaeosaurus''' feeding habits were discovered to be typical of coelurosaurian theropods, with a characteristic "puncture and pull" feeding method. Studies of wearing patterns on its teeth by Angelica Torices et al. in a study regarding theropod feeding habits indicate that dromaeosaurid teeth share similar wearing patterns to those seen in tyrannosaurids and troodontids, respectively. However, micro-wearing on the teeth indicated that Dromaeosaurus likely preferred larger prey items than the troodontids it shared its environment with. Such differentiations in its diet likely allowed it to inhabit the same environment as its more distant maniraptoran relatives. The same study also indicated that both Dromaeosaurus and Saurornitholestes (also analyzed in the study) likely included bones in their diet and were better adapted to handle the stress associated with attacking struggling prey, whereas troodontids, equipped with weaker jaws and smaller teeth, preyed on softer animals and prey items such as invertebrates and carrion. This feeding strategy and ability to handle struggling prey was also a feature that Dromaeosaurus shared with tyrannosaurids such as Gorgosaurus, which was also analyzed in said study alongside these smaller theropods.

See also

 Timeline of dromaeosaurid research

Footnotes

References
 
 
 
 Larsson, H.C.E. 2001. Endocranial anatomy of Carcharodontosaurus saharicus (Theropoda: Allosauroidea) and its implications for theropod brain evolution. pp. 19–33. In: Mesozoic Vertebrate Life. Ed.s Tanke, D. H., Carpenter, K., Skrepnick, M. W. Indiana University Press.
 
 
 
 
 
 Weishampel, David B.; Dodson, Peter; and Osmólska, Halszka (eds.): The Dinosauria'', 2nd, Berkeley: University of California Press. 861 pp. .

Late Cretaceous dinosaurs of North America
Eudromaeosaurs
Fossil taxa described in 1922
Taxa named by William Diller Matthew
Taxa named by Barnum Brown
Paleontology in Alberta
Campanian genus first appearances
Campanian genus extinctions